The Theosophical Society in the Philippines is a branch of the Theosophical Society Adyar with headquarters in Chennai, India.

History
The earliest record of theosophical activity in the Philippines was in 1892 when the Manila Theosophical Society was established in Manila with B. C. Bridger as Secretary.  In 1911, an organization called the Oriental Theosophical Society was formed in the Philippines which did not have any connection with the Theosophical Society in Adyar.1

In 1925, when the Philippines was still a colony of the United States, the Manila Lodge was formed under the Theosophical Society in America. Six other lodges were founded: Cebu, Lotus, Jose Rizal, Soliman, Muñoz and Filipinas, such that in 1933, it was granted a charter by Adyar to become an autonomous section with Ismael Zapata as its first National President and Micaela S. Brilla as the Vice President. Zapata was succeeded by Jose M. Espina of the Cebu Lodge.

During the second world war, activities were suspended. After the war, eight lodges were reorganized, with Domingo Argente as the National President. A piece of land in Quezon City owned by Mr. & Mrs. Roberto Martinez was donated, which has since become the location of the national headquarters. 
Argente was succeeded by Olimpio Cabellon, Benito Reyes, Jose Zulueta, then Argente again, Francisco Escudero, Cleo Z. Greogorio and Vicente Hao Chin, Jr.

The section has hosted two international conference of the Indo-Pacific Federation (1983 and 2007). It has also held the School of Wisdom conducted by Geoffrey Hodson in 1971.

In 1993, the Philippine section developed the Theosophical Core Curriculum, consisting of three parts: theosophical studies, self-transformation, and service work. It also formulated a Mission Statement as well as a Statement of Principles that guide its planning and activities. On the basis of these two statements, it drew up a 10-year plan on its priority projects 1993. The second 10-year plan was approved in 2003.

Activities
As of 2008, the Theosophical Society in the Philippines is actively engaged in the following programs and activities, in addition to its usual work on studies among members, running a public library and bookshop, conducting regular lectures around the country:

Theosophical Publishing House. It is one of the several English theosophical publishing houses. Among the major titles that it has released are Geoffrey Hodson's diary Light of the Sanctuary, The Mahatma Letters to A. P. Sinnett, chronological edition, and the Theosophical Encyclopedia.
Philippine Theosophical Institute. Through this institute it has been conducting the Self-Transformation Seminar both within the Philippines and outside to a wide variety of audiences: schools, businesses, non-government organizations, government organizations, religious organizations and the general public. The institute also regularly runs courses and seminars on theosophy, meditation, spiritual life, Secret Doctrine, Bible analysis, and other related courses.
Theosophical Order of Service. Revived in 1985, this branch of activity has been actively involved in community programs that seek to uplift the welfare of poor communities, including advocacy of vegetarianism and animal welfare. It had launched microfinance programs, community organizations, family education, scholarship programs, medical and dental missions, and the establishment of schools.
 Education. A total of five schools have been established by the Theosophical Society in the Philippines. The major one is the Golden Link College which offers preschool, elementary, high school and collegiate courses. It uses non-traditional approaches to education, such as not using grades, medals and honors as motivations for learning; not using fear or threat; not using competition and contest to bring out excellence in the students; giving major attention to character and personality development, based on the theosophical worldview.
Magazines. The Philippine Theosophical Society has been publishing the Theosophical Digest since 1989 catering mainly to the public. It is being simultaneously printed in India for the Indian market and for overseas readers. In addition to this, it publishes the quarterly Peace Ideas containing condensed ideas on inner and social peace.
Peace Work. The Philippine section is also actively involved in peace work in the Philippines, such as helping the Department of Education develop modules for peace education for elementary schools; conducting seminars and workshops in Mindanao among different ethnic and religious groups; conducting workshops on peace among military officers assigned in Mindanao where there is an ongoing armed conflict in certain areas.
Environment. The TS in the Philippines founded the Green Earth Foundation in order to help promote awareness on our ecological responsibility. Although it is somewhat inactive, it has published a book Helping Save the Earth, cooperated with municipal governments on massive tree planting programs, and has purchased tracts of land for ecological programs.

Organizational structure
The Theosophical Society in the Philippines is an autonomous organization under the Theosophical Society in Adyar, Chennai, India. Its governing body is a Board of Trustees, elected every two years by the members. The officers of the Section (President, Vice President, Treasurer and Secretary) are elected by the Trustees from among themselves. Lodges are autonomous units composed of at least seven members, which usually meets once a week. Study groups need at least one member in order to be recognized by the national headquarters. The lodges and study groups are grouped into two Federations: The Visayas-Mindanao Federation, and the Luzon Federation. Within each Federation, the lodges and study groups are also informally grouped into geographical clusters for purposes of mutual cooperation.

The subsidiary organizations and foundations have their own set of trustees elected by the members, but the Chairman is the President of the Theosophical Society in the Philippines in an ex-oficio capacity.

Note:
1 The primary sources of this history are the following:
Annual Reports of the Theosophical Society (Adyar), 1892 to 2004
Newsletters, 1984 onwards, Theosophical Society in the Philippines
Theosophical Encyclopedia. Theosophical Publishing House, Manila, 2005.

External links
Theosophical Society Adyar
Golden Link College

External links
 Theosophical Society in the Philippines
 Golden Link College
 Theosophical Society (Adyar)

Theosophical Society